Stan Cummins (born 6 December 1958 in Sedgefield, County Durham, England) is an English former footballer,  who played as an attacking midfielder or forward.

Pre-career
In 1970, Cummins, at age 11, was spotted by Middlesbrough Chief Scout Ray Grant playing for Ferryhill Grammar School. Some of Grant's other discoveries were Brian Clough, Mark Proctor, and Tony Mowbray. Grant told Boro's Assistant Manager, Harold Shepherdson, that Cummins had the keenest football brain he had encountered in a boy, and was the most naturally-talented player he had seen since Hughie Gallacher. Shepherdson signed Cummins on Associate Schoolboy Forms for Middlesbrough at age 14, staving off competition from Chelsea, Arsenal, and Aston Villa, to name a few clubs wanting his signature. Grant died on 6 February 2006. Cummins played for the Spennymoor & District Schools Football Association under-14 team for the 1972–73 season, and for the Durham County Schools Football Association under-15 team for the 1973–74 season. He had try-outs for the England Schoolboys' Under-15 team, and was one of the best players on view, but was not selected. Manager Jim Morrow decided that Cummins was too small, and would not have the stamina to compete against the German Schoolboys' under-15 team at Wembley Stadium. Instead, he went to the game on a School trip, and watched it from the terraces, believing that he was good enough to be taking part. That made Cummins more determined than ever to become a Professional Footballer, and prove the doubters wrong.

Career
Cummins began his career with Middlesbrough in 1975 as an apprentice professional, and was coached at youth level by George Wardle, and then by former Scotland and Celtic great Bobby Murdoch. He was voted Boro's Young Player of the Year in 1976. Manager Jack Charlton gave him his debut in the old First Division (now the Premier League) against Ipswich Town at Ayresome Park on 27 November 1976 at the age of only 17, and Cummins went on to become a firm crowd favourite. He played for Boro in a friendly match against Scottish club Hearts a few weeks earlier, and scored in a 3–0 win. Cummins signed professional forms with the club on his 18th birthday. He gained renown as a diminutive, skilful striker/midfielder. While still only a teenager, Jack Charlton suggested that Cummins would one day be the first player to be sold for one million pounds. However, that was not to be the case, for in 1979 Trevor Francis became the first when Nottingham Forest bought him from Birmingham City. In 1977, Cummins had the honour of playing with 1966 World Cup Winner Sir Bobby Charlton in John Hickton's Testimonial Match against Sunderland at Ayresome Park. In the summer of 1977 he played in the North American Soccer League (NASL) at the age of 18 for the Minnesota Kicks against the likes of Pelé, Franz Beckenbauer, Giorgio Chinaglia, and his idol George Best, winning the Western Division Championship. In November of '77, Cummins scored his first league goal in Boro's 1–0 win against Aston Villa at Villa Park. By age 19, he established himself in Boro's first team, and played in their F.A. Cup run of 1978 that took them to the semi-final draw for the first time in their one-hundred-and-two-year history. It was Ipswich Town v. West Bromwich Albion, and Arsenal v. Middlesbrough or Leyton Orient. In the quarter-final, Boro drew 0–0 with Orient at Ayresome Park, then lost the replay 2–1 at Brisbane Road. In January of that year, Boro beat Newcastle United 4–2 at St. James' Park, and Cummins scored Boro's fourth goal, prompting match commentator Kenneth Wolstenholme to say another of his famous one-liners. Immediately after the goal, Wolstenholme said, "That gives him (Cummins) ten out of ten, and one for neatness". Cummins played against Scotland in Willie Maddren's Testimonial Match prior to their departure for the 1978 World Cup in Argentina. Former Boro colleague Graeme Souness also played. Cummins was voted Boro's Player of the Year, and received his award from Vice Chairman Mike McCullagh. In December '78, Middlesbrough beat Chelsea 7–2 at Ayresome Park, and Cummins had three assists. In February 1979, he was a member of the England U21 Squad versus Wales U21 along with Bryan Robson, Glenn Hoddle, Kenny Sansom, and Terry Butcher, coached by Dave Sexton and Terry Venables. He also used to write a weekly column for Scoop, a soccer magazine, as did Kenny Dalglish, Glenn Hoddle, and Peter Barnes.

Cummins joined Sunderland in November 1979 at the age of 20, for £300,000, the Club's most expensive signing in their 100-year history, scoring on his debut in the 3–1 win over Notts. County at Roker Park. He also won the Daily Express National Five-a-side Championship at Wembley Arena that same month. Cummins would also score vital goals for Sunderland in their promotion season of 1979–80. On 9 February 1980 he scored four goals and had one assist in the 5–0 win against Burnley at Roker Park. On 5 April he scored the only goal that beat Newcastle United in the local derby at Roker Park. That record stood for twenty-eight years until Sunderland beat Newcastle United again on home soil on 25 October 2008 when Sunderland won 2–1. He also scored in the 2–0 win against West Ham United to clinch promotion in front of 47,000 fans at Roker Park on 12 May. The following season, he would score the goal which ensured Sunderland's First Division survival away to Liverpool at Anfield in the last game of the season. He was named Sunderland Player of the Year for 1981 and also the North-East of England Outfield Player of the Year for 1981. He was also the only Sunderland player to play in all 46 League and Cup games that season. In the summer of 1981 he returned to the NASL and played for the Seattle Sounders alongside Bruce Rioch and Alan Hudson, winning the Trans-Atlantic Challenge Cup against the New York Cosmos, Glasgow Celtic and Southampton. He also played for the Sounders against the Washington Diplomats featuring Dutch legend Johan Cruyff. In May 1982 Aston Villa won the European Cup beating Bayern Munich 1–0. Three months later in the first fixture of the 1982/83 season Sunderland beat Aston Villa 3–1 at Villa Park, Cummins had two assists and was voted 'Man of the Match'.

In 1983, after his Sunderland contract had expired, Cummins joined Crystal Palace instead of Newcastle United and Kevin Keegan, a move he deeply regrets, returning to Sunderland a year later. He had played with Keegan in John Craggs's Testimonial Match in 1982 and enjoyed Keegan's style of play. His second spell at Roker Park was short-lived. He was a member of the Sunderland Squad who got to the 1985 League Cup Final at Wembley Stadium but couldn't play because he was cup-tied. In May 1985 he captained Sunderland to victory over Middlesbrough in the Final of the Bradford City Disaster Fund North East of England Six-a-Side Tournament held at Teesside Park. All of the proceeds went to Bradford City F.C. In all he made 165 appearances for Sunderland. He left the club following relegation in 1985 for the US at the age of 26 and joined the Minnesota Strikers on a three-year contract in the Major Indoor Soccer League (MISL). The Strikers reached the 1986 MISL Championship only to lose 4 games to 3 (best of seven) to the San Diego Sockers. However, they were crowned MISL Eastern Division Champions in 1988 and on 8 April Cummins scored a hat-trick in the Strikers 4–2 victory against the Chicago Sting and he was carried shoulder high from the playing field by his teammates at the end of the game. The club folded at the end of the season and so Cummins joined the Kansas City Comets for the 1988/89 season. He played in all of the Comets games that season along with teammate Greg Ion. An entertaining and skilful player, Cummins' career spanned 14 years, 10 years in the English Football League where he made 251 appearances in both League and Cup Competitions scoring 50 goals, 2 seasons in the NASL and 4 years in the MISL, USA. He retired as a professional player in 1990 and has a UEFA 'B' coaching certificate.

References

External links
 

English footballers
Middlesbrough F.C. players
Sunderland A.F.C. players
Crystal Palace F.C. players
North American Soccer League (1968–1984) players
Minnesota Kicks players
Seattle Sounders (1974–1983) players
Major Indoor Soccer League (1978–1992) players
Minnesota Strikers (MISL) players
People from Sedgefield
Footballers from County Durham
1958 births
Living people
English Football League players
Association football forwards
English expatriate sportspeople in the United States
Expatriate soccer players in the United States
English expatriate footballers
Association football midfielders